is a Japanese competitor in synchronised swimming. She won Japan's first gold medal in each the solo technical routine and the solo free routine at a FINA World Aquatics Championships at the 2022 World Aquatics Championships. She competed at the 2020 Summer Olympics, in the duet event with Megumu Yoshida, and in the team event.

Career
Yukiko competed in both the women's duet with her partner Chisa Kobayashi, and the women's team events at the 2012 Summer Olympics; she finished in fifth place in both competitions.

Inui has also been a regular competitor at the World Aquatics Championships, taking part in the 2009, 2011 and 2013 tournaments. Her notable podium victories to date include the Asian Games where she has won six silver medals at Guangzhou and Incheon.

At the 2016 Summer Olympics, she won two bronze medals, one in the duet event with Risako Mitsui, and one in the team event.

She won bronze at the 2019 World Aquatics Championships in the Solo Technical Event.

At the 2022 World Aquatics Championships in Budapest, Hungary, Inui won the first medal in any sport of the Championships, winning the gold medal in the solo technical routine, with a score of 92.8662 points. Her gold medal was the first for Japan in the event at a FINA World Aquatics Championships and was choreographed to music by fellow Japanese Hideki Togi in the theme of "The legend of Phoenix". In the preliminaries of the solo free routine two days later, she achieved a score of 94.5667 points and qualified for the final ranking first. For the final, she scored 95.3667 points to win the gold medal, another first gold medal for the country of Japan in the event at a FINA World Aquatics Championships. Her two gold medals made Japan the third country in the 21st century, after Russia and China, to win multiple gold medals in artistic swimming at a single FINA World Aquatics Championships.

References

External links

1990 births
Living people
Japanese synchronized swimmers
Synchronized swimmers at the 2012 Summer Olympics
Synchronized swimmers at the 2016 Summer Olympics
Synchronized swimmers at the 2020 Summer Olympics
Olympic synchronized swimmers of Japan
Artistic swimmers at the 2010 Asian Games
Asian Games medalists in artistic swimming
Artistic swimmers at the 2014 Asian Games
World Aquatics Championships medalists in synchronised swimming
Synchronized swimmers at the 2017 World Aquatics Championships
Synchronized swimmers at the 2015 World Aquatics Championships
Synchronized swimmers at the 2013 World Aquatics Championships
Synchronized swimmers at the 2011 World Aquatics Championships
Synchronized swimmers at the 2009 World Aquatics Championships
Artistic swimmers at the 2019 World Aquatics Championships
Artistic swimmers at the 2022 World Aquatics Championships
Olympic bronze medalists for Japan
Olympic medalists in synchronized swimming
Medalists at the 2016 Summer Olympics
Asian Games silver medalists for Japan
Medalists at the 2010 Asian Games
Medalists at the 2014 Asian Games
Medalists at the 2018 Asian Games
Artistic swimmers at the 2018 Asian Games
Universiade medalists in synchronized swimming
Universiade silver medalists for Japan
Medalists at the 2013 Summer Universiade
20th-century Japanese women
21st-century Japanese women